Military Counterintelligence Service may refer to:
Military Counterintelligence Service (Germany)
Military Counterintelligence Service (Poland)